Suwannee County Airport  is a public-use airport located two nautical miles (3.7 km) west of the central business district of the city of Live Oak in Suwannee County, Florida, United States. The airport is publicly owned. The airport is host to the EAA Chapter 797 which currently operates many festivities in and around the airport. It is also home to the annual Wings Over Suwannee fly-in festival held during every Spring, which is a yearly event organized by several members of the EAA Chapter to expand the local public's use and knowledge of the airport as well as further the education of the next generation of pilots.

References

External links

Airports in Florida
Transportation buildings and structures in Suwannee County, Florida